Raunds railway station is a railway station that once served the town of Raunds in Northamptonshire, England. The railway station was an intermediate stop on the Kettering, Thrapston and Huntingdon Railway line that closed in 1959.

At one time there were plans to extend the Wellingborough - Higham Ferrers branch to Raunds, but the plan was blocked by land owners.

The Manchester, Sheffield & Lincolnshire Railway (the forerunner of the Great Central Railway) proposed a line from Doncaster to Raunds in an early version of its bid to build a trunk line to the capital. This line never came to fruition, and the company eventually built its London Extension via Nottingham, Leicester, Rugby and Brackley.

See also 

 List of closed railway stations in Britain

References

Disused railway stations in Northamptonshire
Former Midland Railway stations
Railway stations in Great Britain opened in 1866
Railway stations in Great Britain closed in 1959
1866 establishments in England
Raunds